There are many churches of the Roman Catholic Jesuit order, many of them patterned after Il Gesu in Rome and dedicated to Saint Ignatius. Nearly all have normal dedications to saints etc. but despite this some are usually known just as the Jesuit Church of the city, including:

The churches are ordered by its completion date.

 Church of the Gesù, Rome, Italy (1568-1580)
 Church of Gesù, Ferrara, Italy (1570)
 Jesuit Church, Molsheim, France (1615-1617)
 Jesuit Church, Lviv, Ukraine (1610-1621)
 Jesuit Church, Warsaw, Poland (1609-1626)
 Jesuit Church, Bratislava, Slovakia (1636-1638)
 Jesui Church, Cusco, Peru (1651-1669)
 Jesuit Church, Valletta, Malta (1593-late 17th century)
 Jesuit Church, Vienna, Austria (1623-1705)
 Jesuit Church, Sibiu, Romania (1726-1733)
 Jesuit Church, Mannheim, Germany (1723-1756)
 Jesuit Chapel (Quebec City), Canada (1818-1930)

See also
 List of Jesuit sites